In this list of museums in Cheshire, England, museums are defined as institutions (including non-profit organisations, government entities and private businesses) that collect and care for objects of cultural, artistic, scientific or historical interest, and that make their collections or related exhibits available for public viewing. Also included are non-profit art galleries and university art galleries. Museums that exist only in cyberspace (virtual museums) are not included.

Many Cheshire museums focus on the area's industrial heritage, including Quarry Bank Mill in Styal and Clarence Mill in Bollington (cotton), the Macclesfield Museums (silk), the Catalyst Science Discovery Centre in Widnes (chemicals), and the Lion Salt Works in Marston and Weaver Hall Museum in Northwich (salt). The Anson Engine Museum in Poynton is on the site of a former colliery. Jodrell Bank Discovery Centre, on the site of the observatory in Lower Withington, explores astronomy. There are also several transport museums, including the Crewe Heritage Centre (railways), the National Waterways Museum in Ellesmere Port and the Anderton Boat Lift (canals). There are water-powered mills at Bunbury, Nether Alderley and Stretton.

The cities of Chester and Warrington each have a combined museum and art gallery, and the towns of Congleton and Nantwich have local museums. Norton Priory is the remains of an Augustinian abbey, and Englesea Brook Chapel and Museum documents the Primitive Methodist movement. Historic house museums are also represented in the county, including Little Moreton Hall and Lyme Park. Cheshire Military Museum in Chester Castle covers the county's regimental history, and RAF Burtonwood Heritage Centre and Hack Green Secret Nuclear Bunker explore more recent military history. The Museum of Policing in Warrington documents Cheshire's police forces. Unusual specialist museums include Cuckooland Museum, which exhibits cuckoo clocks.

Museums and galleries

Defunct museums and galleries
 Axis Arts Centre, Crewe (formerly Alsager Arts Centre), included an art gallery, closed in spring 2019
 Chester Toy and Doll Museum, Chester
 Mouldsworth Motor Museum, Mouldsworth, website, closed in 2013
 On The Air: Broadcasting Museum, Chester, closed in 2000

References

External links
Museums and galleries at the official Cheshire Tourist Board website



 
Cheshire
Museums
Tourist attractions in Cheshire